Watch Out is the seventh studio album by Russian singer Alla Pugacheva released in Sweden in 1985 by World Record Music. 

The album was re-released in the USSR in 1986 by Melodiya under the title Alla Pugacheva v Stokgolme. However, the Soviet edition included fewer songs than were on the original Swedish album.  The total sales of the two editions amounted to 3,200,000 copies.

For the release of this record, the American company Ampex awarded the singer and all the other participants of the recording with a Golden Disc in March 1989.

Track listing

Watch Out

Alla Pugacheva v Stokgolme

Personnel

References

Bibliography

External links
 

1985 albums
Alla Pugacheva albums
Melodiya albums